Curcio is a surname. Notable people with the surname include:

Alessio Curcio (born 1990), Italian football player 
Anthony Curcio (born 1980), American convicted criminal and motivational speaker
Emanuele Curcio (born 1953), Italian football player
Felipe Curcio (born 1993), Brazilian football player
Fernando Curcio (born 1981), Uruguayan football player
Frank Curcio (1912–1988), Australian rules footballer
Gus Curcio (born 1951), American businessman
Ian Curcio (born c. 1973), American Photographer
Juan Curcio (1551–1628), Belgian gunpowder manufacturer 
Maria Curcio (1918 or 1919–2009), Italian classical pianist
Mike Curcio (born 1957), American linebacker
Pat Curcio (born 1973), Canadian ice hockey coach
Renato Curcio (born 1941), Italian left-wing terrorist
Vincenzo Curcio (born c. 1960), Italian Mafioso